CLV may refer to:

 Caldas Novas Airport (IATA code), Brazil
 Campaign for Labour Victory, an organization of the British Labour Party in the late 1970s
 Campus Living Villages, a university student housing development company headquartered in Sydney, Australia
 Cleveland (county), former ceremonial county in England, Chapman code
 Cleveland Spiders (1887–1899), a former Major League Baseball team from Cleveland, Ohio
 Concordant Literal Version, an English translation of the Bible
 Concordia Language Villages, a world-language and culture education program
 Constant linear velocity, a qualifier for the rated speed of an optical disc drive
 Cramlington Learning Village, a high school in Cramlington, Northumberland, England
 Crew Launch Vehicle, a human-crew launch vehicle being developed by NASA for future use
 Customer lifetime value, a prediction of the net profit attributed to the entire future relationship with a customer

See also

 155 (number), in Roman numerals